The American Society for Environmental History (ASEH) is a professional society for the field of environmental history. The ASEH was founded in 1977 and its mission is to increase understanding of current environmental issues by analyzing their historical background. The ASEH promotes scholarship and teaching in environmental history, supports the professional needs of its members, and connects their work with larger communities. The organization's goals are to expand the understanding of the history of human interaction with the natural world, to foster dialogue with multiple disciplines and the public, and to support global environmental history that benefits the public and scholarly communities.

Activities 
The ASEH co-publishes the quarterly journal Environmental History with the Forest History Society through Oxford University Press, as well as a quarterly newsletter, ASEH News.

The ASEH is a member of the National Coalition of History, the American Council of Learned Societies, and the International Consortium of Environmental History Organizations (ICEHO). The ASEH is partnered with several government agencies including the National Park Service, the US Forest Service, and the US Fish and Wildlife Service. With these partners they conduct workshops on toxicology and public health, environmental justice, fire history, urban history, and national parks. They also work with the George Wright Society, Society for Conservation Biology, American Historical Association.

The ASEH sponsors several fellowships and other funding opportunities. The ASEH/Newberry Library Fellowship supports PhD candidates or post-doctoral scholars for one month in residency to do research at the Newberry Library in Chicago. The Samuel P. Hays Research Fellowship supports travel to a manuscript repository for research. The Hal Rothman Dissertation Fellowship supports archival research and travel. National Sporting Library Fellowship supports up to two months in residency for the use of the library's collection. There is also the National Endowment for the Humanities (NEH) Grant that supports those interested in publishing a well-researched book intended to reach a broad audience.

Awards 
The ASEH offers eight awards for outstanding scholarship and achievement. They award four annual prizes for outstanding scholarship including for the best book in environmental history (George Perkins Marsh Prize), the best article published in Environmental History (Leopold-Hidy Prize), the best article published outside of Environmental History (Alice Hamilton Prize), and the best dissertation in environmental history (Rachel Carson Prize). Every two years, they recognize outstanding service and achievement by awarding the Distinguished Scholar Award, Distinguished Service Award, Public Outreach Project Award, and Distinguished Career in Public Environmental History Award. They also award the Division of History of Science and Technology prize every four years to five young historians for an outstanding doctoral dissertation.

Presidents 
 John Opie, 1977–1979
 Wilbur L. Jacobs, 1979–1980
 Donald Worster, 1980–1982
 Morgan Sherwood, 1982–1985
 Clayton R. Koppes, 1985–1987
 John F. Richards, 1987–1989
 William Cronon, 1989–1993
 Martin Melosi, 1993–1995
 Susan Flader, 1995–1997
 Donald Pisani, 1997–1999
 Jeffrey K. Stine, 1999–2001
 Carolyn Merchant, 2001–2003
 Douglas Weiner, 2003–2005
 Stephen Pyne, 2005–2007
 Nancy Langston, 2007–2009
 Harriet Ritvo, 2009–2011
 John McNeill, 2011–2013
 Gregg Mitman, 2013–2015
 Kathleen Brosnan, 2015–2017
 Graeme Wynn, 2017–2019
Edmund Russell, 2020-–

See also 

 Ecology
 Natural environment

References

External links
 American Society for Environmental History
 American Coalition of History
 National Coalition of History
 International Consortium of Environmental History Organizations

Environmental History Websites
 Learning to do Historical Research: A Primer for Environmental Historians and Others
 Environmental History: Explore the Field 
 Rachel Carson Center for Environment and Society
 Environmental Policies Watch 
 Histories and Sustainability
 Gaylord Nelson and Earth Day
 Environment and Society Portal 
 Environmental History Resources
 National Commission on the BP Deepwater Horizon Oil Spill and Offshore Drilling 
 Network in Canadian History and Environment 
 Forest History Society
 The Bill Lane Center for the American West, Stanford University
 Center of the American West, University of Colorado 
 Trading Consequences 
 National Park Service, Marsh/Billings/Rockefeller Park

Environmental history
History organizations based in the United States
Organizations established in 1977
Learned societies of the United States